The 210th Coastal Defence Division was created from a Division zbV staff (an ad hoc headquarters that could be used to form a division around) in July 1942, and shipped north to defend the port Petsamo in Arctic Finland. In late 1944 it moved westward to take up the defense of Vardø in the Norwegian Finnmark.

The division had a non-standard organization, consisting of several battalions of fortress infantry and coastal artillery.

Organization 
The division had the following structure during its existence:

 Headquarters at Trondheim
 661st Fortress Battalion
 662nd Fortress Battalion
 663rd Fortress Battalion
 664th Fortress Battalion
 665th Fortress Battalion
 37th Army Coastal Defense Artillery Regiment
 448th Army Coastal Defense Artillery Battalion
 478th Army Coastal Defense Artillery Battalion
 480th Army Coastal Defense Artillery Battalion
 773rd Army Coastal Defense Artillery Battalion
 3rd Battalion, 67th Mountain Signal Battalion (Later became 210th Signal Company)
210th Divisional Supply Group
(Later Added - 9th Motorcycle Battalion)

Commanders 
The division only had 2 commanders during its time :

 Generalleutnant Karl Wintergerst (15.07.1942 – 01.02.1944)
 Generalleutnant Kurt Ebeling (01.02.1944 – 08.05.1945)

See also 
List of German divisions in World War II

References 

 Wendel, Marcus (2004). "210. Küste-Abwehr-Infanterie-Division". Retrieved April 7, 2005.
 "210. Infanterie-Division". German language article at www.lexikon-der-wehrmacht.de. Retrieved April 7, 2005.

German units in the Arctic
Military units and formations established in 1942
Infantry divisions of Germany during World War II
Military units and formations disestablished in 1945